Sir Kina Bona  is a judge of the Supreme Court of Papua New Guinea. He is a former president of the Papua New Guinea Law Society.

Honours
In 1993, Bona was made a Knight Commander of the Order of the British Empire Queen Elizabeth II in the 1993 Birthday Honours for public service.

References

Living people
Papua New Guinean judges
Papua New Guinean knights
Knights Commander of the Order of the British Empire
Year of birth missing (living people)